The Lincoln County School District  1 is a public school district in Lincoln County, Wyoming, United States, based in Diamondville, Wyoming.

Schools
The Lincoln County School District #1 has one elementary school, one middle school, one alternative school and one high school.

Elementary schools
 Kemmerer Elementary School

Middle school
 Canyon Elementary School

Alternative schools
 New Frontier High School

High school
Kemmerer High School

References

External links

School districts in Wyoming
Kemmerer, Wyoming
Education in Lincoln County, Wyoming